Toxidia rietmanni, the white-brand skipper or whitebranded grass-skipper, is a butterfly of the family Hesperiidae. It is found in the Australian states of New South Wales and Queensland.

The wingspan is about 25 mm.

The larvae feed on Oplismenus species. They construct a tubular shelter by joining leaves with silk. It rests in this shelter during the day.

Subspecies
Toxidia rietmanni parasema  (Lower, 1908)  (northern Queensland)
Toxidia rietmanni rietmanni  (Semper, 1879)  (southern Queensland and in New South Wales)

External links
Australian Insects
Australian Faunal Directory

Trapezitinae
Butterflies described in 1879
Butterflies of Australia
Taxa named by Georg Semper